Pipemidic acid is a member of the pyridopyrimidine class of antibacterials, which display some overlap in mechanism of action with analogous pyridone-containing quinolones. It was introduced in 1979 and is active against gram negative and some gram positive bacteria. It was used for gastrointestinal, biliary, and urinary infections. The marketing authorization of pipemidic acid has been suspended throughout the EU.

References

Quinolone antibiotics
Pyridopyrimidines
Piperazines